Hays Consolidated Independent School District is a public school district based in Kyle, Texas (USA).  In addition to Kyle, the district serves the city of Buda, and other areas in northern Hays County.  The Hays Consolidated Independent School District reaches more than 221 square miles. The district's 23 campuses are located throughout northern Hays County, serving nearly 20,000 students.

In 2009, the school district was rated "academically acceptable" by the Texas Education Agency.

Schools

High schools (Grades 9-12)
 Jack C. Hays High School, Buda
 Lehman High School, Kyle
 Live Oak Academy 
 Impact Center
 Johnson High School, Buda

Middle schools (Grades 6-8)
 Barton Middle School
 Chapa Middle School
 Dahlstrom Middle School
 McCormick Middle School 
 Simon Middle School
 Wallace Middle School

Elementary schools
Grades PK-5
 Fuentes Elementary School
 Green Elementary School
 Hemphill Elementary School
 Kyle Elementary School
 Tobias Elementary School
Grades K-5
 Blanco Vista Elementary School
 Buda Elementary School
 Camino Real Elementary School
 Carpenter Hill Elementary School
 Elm Grove Elementary School
 Negley Elementary School
 Pfluger Elementary School
 Science Hall Elementary School
 Sunfield Elementary School
 Uhland Elementary School

References

External links

 

School districts in Hays County, Texas
School districts in Travis County, Texas
School districts in Caldwell County, Texas
San Marcos, Texas
Education in Austin, Texas